The Judiciary of Vermont is the state court system of Vermont, charged with Vermont law.

Vermont Constitution
The Vermont courts are established in the Vermont Constitution in sections 28-41 (Judiciary Department). The justices of the Vermont Supreme Court and judges of all lower courts except assistant judges and probate judges serve for six-year terms, which are renewable following a majority retention vote in the Vermont General Assembly.

All Vermont Constitution provides for a mandatory retirement of Supreme Court justices and lower court judges at 90 years of age, as prescribed by law by the General Assembly, or if the General Assembly has not so provided by law at the age of 70 or at the end of the term of election during which they attain the age of 70. The constitution also provides that justices and judges be given a pension as provided by law and that the chief justice "may from time to time appoint retired justices and judges to special assignments as permitted under the rules of the Supreme Court."

Supreme Court
The Vermont Supreme Court is the state supreme court, based in the state capital of Montpelier. Because Vermont has no intermediate appellate courts, it is the sole state appellate court, mainly hearing appeals on questions of law from lower courts, although there are a few instances in which the Court has original jurisdiction.  The Supreme Court also is responsible for administration of the Vermont court system; it makes state court procedural rules.

The Supreme Court is established in the Vermont Constitution which provides in section 29 that the court shall consist of a chief justice and four associate justices and in section 30 that:
The Supreme Court shall exercise appellate jurisdiction in all cases, criminal and civil, under such terms and conditions as it shall specify in rules not inconsistent with law. The Supreme Court shall have original jurisdiction only as provided by law, but it shall have the power to issue all writs necessary or appropriate in aid of its appellate jurisdiction. The Supreme Court shall have administrative control of all the courts of the state, and disciplinary authority concerning all judicial officers and attorneys at law in the State.

In 2008, justices were paid $129,245 annually. This ranks 41st in the nation.

County courts

The state constitution provides for the creation of lower courts that may have original and appellate jurisdiction and be divided into geographical and functional divisions, "as provided by law or by judicial rules adopted by the Supreme Court not inconsistent with law." The state constitution also provides that state courts may act as both courts of law and courts of equity.

Vermont Statutes have established a number of courts, each exercising jurisdiction in one of the 14 Vermont counties. The courts are based in shire towns (County seats), where the courthouses are located. The state's attorney may earn $89,003.20 annually. The county sheriff may earn $65,790.40 annually.

In 2010 the court system was integrated. The criminal, civil, family and environmental courts became part of a new Superior Court. The Probate Court was merged with the family court in February 2011 and all applicable county employees became state employees.

Superior courts

Superior Courts exercise exclusive jurisdiction over most civil cases, including torts and lawsuits over small claims of $5000 or less. Superior courts also reviews decisions of lower courts and appeals to administrative agency decisions. Three judges, a presiding judge and two assistant judges sit on each Superior Court. The assistant judges (or side judges) are elected county officials, who sit with the judge in certain cases and are responsible for non-judicial county affairs as well, an unusual system unique to Vermont. Each Superior Court also has a court clerk and deputy court clerk, appointed by the court. The Superior Court clerk is also the county clerk and the clerk of the county court.

District courts
District Courts hear almost all criminal cases and a few civil cases, including civil suspension of driver's licenses and fish and wildlife, traffic ticket, and municipal ordinance violations. There are 17 District Court judges: one in each county except for Chittenden County (the most populous in the state), which has six. A district judge may earn $122,865 annually.

Family courts
Family courts hear family law matters, including marriage (divorce, annulment, desertion, and separation); child support; parentage;  domestic violence and orders of protection for domestic abuse victims; juveniles (delinquency, abuse and neglect) and commitments to the Vermont State Hospital, the state psychiatric hospital. District Court judges, Superior Court judges, Family Court magistrates and assistant judges sit in Family Court. All Family Court matters except for child support are mainly decided by the presiding judge; child support orders are the responsibility of Family Court magistrates. No jury trials take place in Family Court. If one or both are available, side judges may sit with the presiding judge. In some jurisdictions, the Superior Court judge may be the presiding judge of the Family Court as well.

Probate courts
Probate Courts deal with probate, wills and testamentary trusts, adoptions, guardianship, emancipation of minors, uniform gifts to minors, and name changes. There are 18 Probate Court judges, elected for four-year terms; Probate Court judges need not be attorneys. The clerk of the probate court is appointed. A typical salary for the judge is  $51,542.40. A typical salary for the clerk is $30,721.60.

Vermont Environmental Court
The Vermont Environmental Court is a specialized court dealing with environmental law. The Court hears appeals from municipal boards and commissions and appeals from Act 250 decisions as well as cases from the Agency of Natural Resources, Natural Resource Board, and municipal enforcement. There are two Environmental Court judges on the court, which is based in Barre.

Vermont Judicial Bureau
The Vermont Judicial Bureau is a specialized court with subject matter jurisdiction over civil violations of Vermont law and municipal ordinances.  The Judicial Bureau operates under the supervision of the Vermont Supreme Court.  Appeals from the Judicial Bureau are heard by the Criminal Division of the Vermont Superior Court.  Appeals filed by the State are heard on the record.  Appeals filed by a defendant may be on the record, de novo by judge, or de novo by jury at the option of the defendant.  The Judicial Bureau operates under the Vermont Rules of Civil Procedure, in particular V.R.C.P. 80.6.

Civil violations include an array of decriminalized conduct involving operation of motor vehicles (traffic), hunting/fishing/trapping, possession of alcohol/tobacco/marijuana, hazing, lead paint abatement, unreasonable noise, animal cruelty, etc.  Police officers, municipal officials designated by the legislative body of a municipality, county state's attorneys, the state attorney general, and certain other state executive branch officials have authority to prosecute civil violations.  Defendants typically conduct their own defense, but may hire attorney at their own expense.

Pre-trial motions and discovery are not allowed, unless permission has been granted by a judicial officer.  At the merits hearing, both parties may call witnesses and offer exhibits.  Witnesses may be compelled to appear by subpoena.  The burden of proof is on the State or municipality to prove the alleged violation by clear and convincing evidence, meaning the truth of the facts asserted is highly probable.  This burden is higher than the ordinary civil burden of proof by a preponderance of the evidence, but lower than the criminal burden of proof beyond a reasonable doubt.  If the State or municipality meets its burden of proof, the assessed penalties may include a fine, demerit points or suspension of a driver license or fish & wildlife license, and community service.

Merits hearings and motion hearings are conducted throughout the State by various judicial officers, including a statewide Chief Hearing Officer, a statewide Hearing Officer, and several county Assistant Judges.  Contempt hearings are conducted by Hearing Officers.  Hearing Officers also sit in the Vermont Superior Court by special assignment.  Hearing Officers are members of the Vermont Bar appointed by the Chief Superior Court Judge.  Assistant Judges are citizens elected in their respective county of residence.  The Judicial Bureau has one Clerk.  The Clerk supervises the Court Operations Manager and a statewide administrative staff at the courthouse in White River Junction.

Budget
The judiciary system budget was approximately $30 million in 2009.

See also
 Government of Vermont

Notes

External links
Official website
Maximum salaries of Vermont State Officers including justices of the Supreme Court

Government of Vermont
Vermont state courts
Vermont